Bistolida is a genus of sea snails, marine gastropod mollusks in the family Cypraeidae, the cowries.

Species
Species within the genus Bistolida include:
Bistolida brevidentata (Sowerby, 1870)
 Bistolida diauges (Melvill, 1888) 
Bistolida erythraeensis (Sowerby, 1837)
 Bistolida fuscomaculata (Pease, 1865)
Bistolida goodallii (Sowerby, 1832)
Bistolida hirundo (Linnaeus, 1758)
Bistolida kieneri (Hidalgo, 1906) 
 Bistolida nanostraca Lorenz & Chiapponi, 2012
Bistolida owenii (Sowerby, 1837) 
 Bistolida piae Lorenz & Chiapponi, 2005
Bistolida stolida (Linnaeus, 1758)
Bistolida ursellus (Gmelin, 1791) 
 Bistolida vasta Schilder & Schilder, 1938
Species brought into synonymy
Bistolida summersi Schilder, 1958: synonym of Blasicrura summersi (Schilder, 1958)

References

External links
 Jousseaume, F. (1884). Division des Cypraeidae. Le Naturaliste. 6(52): 414-415
 Iredale, T. (1935). Australian cowries. The Australian Zoologist. 8(2): 96-135, pls 8-9

Cypraeidae
Gastropod genera